Ann Brannon (born 10 October 1958) is a British fencer. She competed at the 1980, 1984 and 1988 Summer Olympics.

References

1958 births
Living people
British female fencers
Olympic fencers of Great Britain
Fencers at the 1980 Summer Olympics
Fencers at the 1984 Summer Olympics
Fencers at the 1988 Summer Olympics
Sportspeople from London